Lyulph Ambrose Jonathan Lubbock, 5th Baron Avebury (born 15 June 1954) is a British hereditary peer. He is the first son of the 4th Lord Avebury and Kina-Maria O'Kelly. He succeeded his father to the title of Baron Avebury upon his father's death on 14 February 2016.

The Lord Avebury married Susan MacDonald in 1977, with whom he has two children, Vanessa Lubbock (born 15 April 1983) and Alexander Lyulph Robert Lubbock (born 17 January 1985), his heir apparent.

References

External links 
 The family's entry on Cracroft's Peerage

Lyulph
Living people
1954 births